Josip Juratovic (born 15 January 1959) is a German-Croatian auto mechanic, trade unionist and politician of the Social Democratic Party (SPD) who has been serving as a member of the Bundestag from the state of Baden-Württemberg since 2005.

Political career 
Juratovic first became member of the Bundestag in the 2005 German federal election, representing Heilbronn. From 2005 until 2013, he served on the Committee on Labour and Social Affairs. Since 2014, he has been a member of the Committee on Foreign Affairs. In this capacity, he serves as his parliamentary group’s rapporteur on relations with South-Eastern Europe.

In addition to his committee assignments, Juratovic chairs the German Parliamentary Friendship Group for Relations with the States of South-Eastern Europe and co-chairs the German Parliamentary Friendship Group for Relations with the Northern Adriatic States. He has also been a substitute member of the German delegation to the Parliamentary Assembly of the Council of Europe (PACE) since 2014, where he has served on the Committee on Migration, Refugees and Displaced Persons (since 2014) and the Sub-Committee on Education, Youth and Sport (2015-2018).

Other activities 
 IG Metall, Member

References

External links 

  
 Bundestag biography 

1959 births
Living people
Members of the Bundestag for Baden-Württemberg
Members of the Bundestag 2021–2025
Members of the Bundestag 2017–2021
Members of the Bundestag 2013–2017
Members of the Bundestag 2009–2013
Members of the Bundestag 2005–2009
People from Koprivnica
German people of Croatian descent
Naturalized citizens of Germany
Members of the Bundestag for the Social Democratic Party of Germany
Yugoslav emigrants to West Germany